Anti-piracy may refer to:

 Anti-piracy, protection against copying of computer software
 Piracy#Anti-piracy measures anti-piracy measures, measures to counter maritime pirates

See also
 Pirate (disambiguation)